This is a list of public art in the county of Shropshire, England. This list applies only to works of public art on permanent display in an outdoor public space. For example, this does not include artworks in museums.

Bridgnorth

Craven Arms

Ironbridge

Oswestry

Shrewsbury

The Quarry

Town Centre

English Bridge Gardens

Cherry Orchard

References 

sh
public
Public art